Casey Jay Wellman (born October 18, 1987) is an American professional ice hockey center currently playing with Oulun Kärpät of the Finnish Liiga.

Playing career
As a youth, Wellman played in the 2001 Quebec International Pee-Wee Hockey Tournament with the San Jose Junior Sharks minor ice hockey team.

A native of Brentwood, California, while in high school, Wellman played hockey at Cranbrook Kingswood School in Bloomfield Hills, Michigan, winning state titles in 2004 and 2006. He then attended the University of Massachusetts Amherst for two years where he played on the UMass Minutemen ice hockey team. 
 
He was signed to a two-year entry level contract on March 16, 2010, as a college free-agent.

On February 3, 2012, Wellman was traded to the New York Rangers for center Erik Christensen and a conditional 7th round draft pick in 2013.  He spent the remainder of the 2011–12 season with the Whale, but after Connecticut was eliminated from the AHL playoffs, Wellman was added to the Rangers' playoff roster.

On July 20, 2012, Wellman was traded to the Florida Panthers in exchange for a 2014 5th round draft pick. He started the 2012–13 season with AHL affiliate, the San Antonio Rampage before he was traded by the Panthers to the Washington Capitals in exchange for forward Zach Hamill on January 31, 2013.

Wellman was called up to the Capitals on December 17, 2013. He was reassigned to the AHL Hershey Bears on December 23, 2013. He was recalled a second time to the Washington Capitals on January 24, 2014 in time to play with the Capitals as they faced Montreal.  Wellman scored a goal off of an assist from Capitals captain Alex Ovechkin in the second period and helped the team end a seven-game losing streak.

On June 4, 2015, HC Spartak Moscow of the KHL announced that it has signed Wellman. He saw the ice in 40 games, tallying eight goals and eight assists for Spartak. Upon the conclusion of the 2015–16 season, Wellman moved on to Sweden, penning a one-year deal with SHL side Frölunda HC on May 30, 2016.

After two seasons in the National League with Swiss club, SC Rapperswil-Jona Lakers, Wellman returned to the KHL in signing a one-year contract with Chinese based, HC Kunlun Red Star, on September 16, 2020. With Kunlun later stationed in Russia for the duration of the 2020–21 season due to logistics surrounding the COVID-19 pandemic, Wellman contributed with 13 points through 31 regular season games.

Wellman left the KHL as a free agent and was signed to a two-year contract with Finnish club, Oulun Kärpät of the Liiga, on May 28, 2021.

Family
Wellman is the son of former Giants infielder Brad Wellman.

Career statistics

Awards and honors

References

External links

1987 births
Living people
American men's ice hockey centers
Ice hockey players from California
People from Brentwood, California
People from Castro Valley, California
Cedar Rapids RoughRiders players
Connecticut Whale (AHL) players
Frölunda HC players
Hershey Bears players
Houston Aeros (1994–2013) players
HC Kunlun Red Star players
Minnesota Wild players
SC Rapperswil-Jona Lakers players
San Antonio Rampage players
Sportspeople from Castro Valley, California
HC Sochi players
HC Spartak Moscow players
UMass Minutemen ice hockey players
Undrafted National Hockey League players
Washington Capitals players